The 2015–16 season was Sepahan's 15th season in the Pro League, and their 22nd consecutive season in the top division of Iranian Football and 62nd year in existence as a football club. They competed in the Hazfi Cup and the AFC Champions League. Sepahan was captained by Moharram Navidkia.

Players
Updated 4 June 2015.

First-team squad

Loan list

For recent transfers, see List of Iranian football transfers winter 2015–16.

Managerial staff

Current managerial staff
{| class=wikitable
|-
! style="color:#000; background:#ffc900;"|Position
! style="color:#000; background:#ffc900;"|Name
|-

Sponsorship

Matches

Pro league

Hazfi Cup

Friendly Matches

Competitions

Overall

Pro league

League table

Results summary

Results by round

Goal scorers

Overall

Pro League

Hazfi Cup

|-
| colspan="12"|Last update: 4 February  2016
|-

TransfersLast updated on 02 February 2016''

Summer

In:

Out:

Winter

In:

Out:

See also
 2015–16 Iran Pro League
 2015–16 Hazfi Cup

References

External links
  Club Official Website
  The Club page in Soccerway.com
  The Club page in Persianleague.com

 
Sepahan